Mount Hope is an unincorporated community and census-designated place (CDP) that is a part of Rockaway Township, in Morris County in the U.S. state of New Jersey.

It was formerly an unincorporated iron mining village associated with the American Revolutionary War. Mining operations were said to have begun around 1710 and operated continuously through the 1970s. John Jacob Faesch was the first to develop Mount Hope into an iron plantation with the erection of a stone furnace in 1772 and operated the facility until his death in 1799. Various owners and lessees ran the furnace until 1831 when The Mount Hope Mining Company was incorporated in response to the opening of the Morris Canal and its transportation opportunities. Operations ceased from 1893 to 1899 due to financial panics, the opening of the Mesabi Range and cheaper imported iron ore from South America. Empire Steel & Iron Company bought the mine and reopened it in 1900. Additional companies and partnerships continued until its final closure in 1979.

The Mount Hope Miners' Church was added to the National Register of Historic Places in 2012 for its significance in architecture, social history, and religion.

Demographics

References

Sources
The Highlander Magazine "John Jacob Faesch, Ironmaster" by Ernst Kraus, 1974  
The Historical Society of Rockaway Township

Census-designated places in Morris County, New Jersey
Unincorporated communities in Morris County, New Jersey
Rockaway Township, New Jersey
Unincorporated communities in New Jersey